Lars Petter Sveen (born 30 October 1981) is a Norwegian novelist.

Sveen was born in Fræna. He made his literary debut in 2008 with the short story collection Køyre frå Fræna, for which he received Tarjei Vesaas' debutantpris, as well as Aschehougs debutantstipend and Sunnmørsprisen. He was awarded the Nynorsk Literature Prize in 2014, for the novel Guds barn.

References

1981 births
Living people
People from Fræna
Norwegian male novelists
21st-century Norwegian novelists
Norwegian male short story writers
21st-century Norwegian male writers